Kahurangi Taylor is a New Zealand beauty pageant titleholder who represented New Zealand at Miss World 2008 in South Africa.

In 2015, Kahurangi won a NZD$100,000 Vodafone Foundation World of Difference Award, working alongside the outreach team at Te Ara Rangatu o te Iwi o Te Ata Waiohua (TAR) to benefit the community of Waiuku. This follows two years of work as a youth health project co-ordinator at Manurewa Marae.

Kahurangi's iwi is Ngati Te Ata.

References

External links

1991 births
Living people
Miss World 2008 delegates
Miss New Zealand winners
People from Auckland